The 1955 Greenock by-election was a parliamentary by-election held on 8 December 1955 for the British House of Commons constituency of Greenock in Renfrewshire, Scotland.

The vacancy had been created by the death of the incumbent Labour MP Hector McNeil, and the seat was won by the future Labour Minister Dickson Mabon.

Candidates
Labour selected Mabon, who at only thirty would become the youngest Labour MP. He had served as a Bevin Boy and in the army. He had been chairman of the Labour Club (1948–50), then chairman of the National Association of Labour Students in 1949–1950, and finally president of Glasgow University Union in 1951–52, and of the Scottish Union of Students, 1954–55.

The Unionist candidate was Ian MacArthur, who was also thirty, and who worked as an associate director of a marketing and advertising company; he had also contested the seat at the general election earlier that year.

Previous result

By-election result

References

1955 elections in the United Kingdom
1955 in Scotland
1950s elections in Scotland
December 1955 events in the United Kingdom
By-elections to the Parliament of the United Kingdom in Scottish constituencies